Jean Mulder is a linguist. Mulder's research interests include Australian English and Tsimshian, a North American Indian language. Mulder is currently an Honorary Senior Fellow in the Department of Linguistics at the University of Melbourne, having been a Professor there until 2017. She is currently the editor of the Australian Journal of Linguistics.

Early life and education 
Mulder was born in Niskayuna, New York. She earned a BA in mathematics and linguistics from the University of California, Santa Barbara, and received her MA in 1978 and PhD in 1988, both in linguistics, from the University of California, Los Angeles.

She is a publicly regarded expert on Australian English, working specifically on features of morphology and syntax. Of particular note is her work on 'final but' in Australian English.

Mulder has also been extensively involved in developing and promoting the Victorian Certificate of Education subject English Language. As part of this she is also a strong public advocate of teaching linguistics and grammar in schools.

Selected publications 

 Mulder, J., & Sellers, H. (2010). Classifying clitics in Sm'algyax: Approaching theory from the field. In Berez, A., Mulder, J., & Rosenblum, D. (eds.), Fieldwork and linguistic analysis in Indigenous languages of the Americas, Language Documentation & Conservation Special Publication No. 2, 33-56.  
Mulder, J., & Thompson, S. A. (2008). The grammaticization of but as a final particle in English conversation. Crosslinguistic studies of clause combining: The multifunctionality of conjunctions, 80, 179-204.
 Mulder, J. (2007). Establishing linguistics in secondary education in Victoria, Australia. Language and Linguistics Compass, 1(3), 133-154.
 Burridge, K., & Mulder, J. G. (1998). English in Australia and New Zealand: An introduction to its history, structure, and use. Oxford: Oxford University Press.
 Mulder, J. G. (1994). Ergativity in Coast Tsimshian (Sm'algyax) (Vol. 124). Univ of California Press.

References

External links 
 University of Melbourne website

Living people
Academic staff of the University of Melbourne
Linguists from Australia
1954 births
University of California, Los Angeles alumni
University of California, Santa Barbara alumni